Raphismia is a genus of dragonfly in the family Libellulidae, found across Southeast Asia to Australia.
One species, Raphismia bispina is a small dragonfly found in mangrove swamps.

Species
The genus Raphismia includes two species:

See also
 List of Odonata species of Australia

References

Libellulidae
Anisoptera genera
Odonata of Asia
Odonata of Australia
Taxa named by William Forsell Kirby
Insects described in 1889